Steven Diez (born March 17, 1991) is a Canadian and former Spanish professional tennis player. Raised primarily in and competing for Spain early in his career, he has since gone on to represent the country of his birth, Canada, in the Davis Cup. Diez was a member of the Canadian team that won the 2022 ATP Cup.

Tennis career

2007
Diez competed in the main draw of two senior level ITF Futures tournaments in the autumn, losing both times in the first round.  In his first match, at Spain F39 in late October, he fell to world No. 422 Carles Poch-Gradin.  He fared much better a month later taking a set off world No. 425 Juan Albert Viloca-Puig before losing.

2008
Diez won his first tour match in his third tournament of the year, Spain F11.  He won his first ever doubles match too, partnering Ignacio Morente-Gemas  to the second round of Spain F13.  He then won two matches partnering Javier Valenzuela-Gonzalez  to reach the semi-finals of Spain F14.  The same pairing reached the semis in their next tournament too, in July, at Spain F26.

In late April he competed in qualifying for an ATP World Tour event, the 2008 Torneo Godó, losing in the first round to Marc López.  In July in consecutively played Futures he won his first round match, but he failed, in singles, to reach the second round in his last five events of the year.  Partnering  Valenzuela-Gonzalez, he reached the second round in more events than not during this same stretch.  He finished the year ranked World No. 1190 in singles and No. 1274 in doubles.

2009
In his third main draw for the year Diez had a break through in reaching the semi-finals of Spain F5.  Two weeks later he reached his first career final, in doubles partnering José Checa Calvo at Spain F7.  In June, he competed in his first main draw in an ATP Challenger, as a wild card entrant at the 2009 Open Diputación Ciudad de Pozoblanco, and reached the quarter-finals, where he lost to eventual runner-up, Thiago Alves.

The following week Diez captured his first tour title, that of Spain F23 in singles, defeating David Canudas-Fernandez  in the final. His singles wins stopped there as he won only one further tour main draw main for the remainder of the year while losing 8.  In doubles however Diez continued to do well not losing in the first round for the year aside from his very first tourney.  He finished the year ranked World No. 571 in singles and No. 893 in doubles.

2010
Diez did not win a singles main draw match in his first five events of the year leading into a call-up of sorts by Tennis Canada to represent the country of this birth in Davis Cup.  Diez was recruited for his clay court ability as Canada faced Colombia on red clay in Bogota.  Despite breaking the serve in the first game of the match, Diez went down to World No. 93 Santiago Giraldo in straight sets as Canada lost the tie, 1-4.

In April, Diez finally won a main draw singles match, at Spain F11.  He reached the second round in three consecutive events before taking his second title of this career, Spain F15 in May.  He then reached the semi-finals in two of his next three events.  As one of the top-ranked Canadians, Diez received wild cards into events in Canada this summer.  After losing in the first round of the 2010 Challenger Banque Nationale de Granby, he qualified for the main draw of the 2010 Odlum Brown Vancouver Open, but lost in three close sets to Alex Kuznetsov in the first round.  He won a set from Michael Russell before falling in the first round of qualifying for the 2010 Rogers Cup in Toronto in early August.

After reaching the semi-finals of Spain F30 the week after the Rogers Cup, and losing in the first round of Belgium F3 the following week, Diez was off from match play until last week, where, as the No. 6 seed at Canada F4, he reached the semi-finals.  En route he won his quarter-final match over No. 2 seed Brendan Evans, 3-6, 6-1, 3-0 retired.  In doubles, he and partner Nikolai Haessig, a top Canadian junior, lost in the first round.

The following week Diez was upset in the first round of Canada F5, as the No. 4 seed, to World No. 792 Phillip Simmonds , 2-6, 3-6.  He and partner Haessig reached the semi-finals in doubles however.  This result saw Steven's doubles ranking reach a new career high the following week, of World No. 769.  After two weeks off, he played three consecutive Futures events in Spain, reaching the second round in Spain F37 in Sabadell, the quarter-finals at Spain F38 in Sant Cugat, and losing in the first round of Spain F39 in Vilafranca del Penedes.  In doubles, he and partner Abraham Gonzalez-Jimenez reached the second round of Spain F37 and lost in the first round of Spain F38.  They did not compete at Spain F39.

2019: Career-high ranking

2020: Grand Slam debut at French Open

2022: ATP Cup champion
He won the ATP Cup with team Canada defeating the Spanish team.

Singles performance timeline

Other finals

Team competitions: 1 (1 title)

Challenger and Futures finals

Singles: 41 (23–18)

Doubles: 21 (9–12)

References

External links

1991 births
Living people
Canadian male tennis players
Canadian people of Spanish descent
People from Marbella
Sportspeople from the Province of Málaga
Spanish people of Canadian descent
Tennis players from Barcelona
Tennis players from Toronto
Canadian expatriate sportspeople in Spain